José Antonio Vilariño (19 May 1961 – 8 April 2022) was an Argentine engineer and politician. A member of the Victory Party, he served in the Argentine Chamber of Deputies from 1995 to 1999 and again from 2003 to 2015. He died of cardiac arrest in Buenos Aires on 8 April 2022 at the age of 60.

References

1961 births
2022 deaths
20th-century Argentine politicians
21st-century Argentine politicians
Members of the Argentine Chamber of Deputies elected in Salta
People from Salta Province